Partnoy is a surname. Notable people with the surname include:

 Alicia Partnoy (born 1955), human rights activist, poet, professor, and translator
 Frank Partnoy (born 1967), American legal scholar
 Raquel Partnoy (born 1932), Argentine painter, poet, and essayist

See also
 Portnoy